The Alliance for Democracy and Development (ADD) was a political party in Benin.

History
The party contested the 1995 parliamentary elections, in which it received 2.5% of the vote, winning a single seat, taken by Layé Dramane. Prior to the 1999 elections it joined the Republican Alliance alongside the New Generation for the Republic and New Impetus for Progress. However, the alliance failed to win a seat.

References

Defunct political parties in Benin